Dawson Earle Trotman (March 25, 1906 – June 18, 1956) was an evangelist and founder of the Navigators.

Biography
Trotman was born on March 25, 1906, in Bisbee, Arizona, US.

Ministry
Trotman founded the Navigators in 1933.  He lost his life on June 18, 1956, while rescuing a girl, Allene Beck, from drowning during water-skiing in Schroon Lake, New York.

Trotman worked with many other evangelicals of his day, including Henrietta Mears, Jim Rayburn, Charles E. Fuller, Bill Bright, Billy Graham, and Dick Hillis. Lorne Sanny (1920–2005) succeeded him as president of the Navigators after Trotman's wife Lila was its short-term interim president.

Personal life
Trotman married Lila Mae Clayton on July 3, 1932.  Lila, who was born on December 12, 1913 in Buffalo Valley, Tennessee, died on October 27, 2004 at the age of 90. The couple had five children.

Bibliography

References

External links
 "Religion: The Navigator". Time. July 2, 1956.
 Born to Reproduce
 The Need of the Hour (which is that tools may be cute, but the influence of the man of God to spread the knowledge of God is vital)
 The Wheel illustration (for the CHRIST-ian life in action, Dawson Trotman's original version)
 The Hand illustration (for getting a HAND-le on the Word of God), now also known as the "WORD-hand" illustration
 The "Prayer-Hand" illustration (five key ingredients of Prayer)
 The Big Dipper illustration (the seven distinctive elements of the Navigators as an organization)

1906 births
1956 deaths
People from Bisbee, Arizona
American evangelicals